Mnyovniki is a station on the Bolshaya Koltsevaya line of the Moscow Metro. It opened on 1 April 2021. It remained the terminus of the line until on 7 December 2021 an extension to Kakhovskaya opened.

Name

References

Moscow Metro stations
Railway stations in Russia opened in 2021
Bolshaya Koltsevaya line
Railway stations located underground in Russia